Tatiana Rouba Beniarz (born 15 September 1983 in Barcelona, Catalonia) is a female freestyle swimmer from Spain, who competed for her native country at the 2004 Summer Olympics in Athens, Greece. There she was a member of the three women's relay teams. In 2002, she won the silver medal in the 4×200 m freestyle relay at the European Championships in Berlin.

References
Spanish Olympic Committee

1983 births
Living people
Spanish female freestyle swimmers
Olympic swimmers of Spain
Swimmers at the 2004 Summer Olympics
Swimmers from Barcelona
European Aquatics Championships medalists in swimming
Mediterranean Games silver medalists for Spain
Swimmers at the 2005 Mediterranean Games
Mediterranean Games medalists in swimming